Mu Eka Tumara is a 2013 Indian Odia language romantic drama film. The film is written by Sidharth and directed by Susant Mani and stars Sabyasachi and Archita in their Seventh movie together. This film won the Best Odia film, Best Oriya Direction, Best Oriya Actor (Male) and Best Oriya Actor (Female) categories in the Filmfare Awards East 2013. The film was a remake of 2003 Kannada blockbuster film Chandra Chakori starring Sri Murali.

Plot
The Movie premise is of a Big Odia wedding where Virendra(Mihir Das)’s son Mahesh(Debashis) is all set to marry Pratap (Prutiviraj Nayak)’s daughter Chitralekha(Archita). Both families have come together to stay at Virendra’s farm-house for the next four days for this grand wedding. Introduced here is Raju(Sabyasachi) who works as a servant at Virendra’s place. Raju is an innocent person who can hear and understand everything but is unable to speak a word. Circumstances lead to Raju rescuing Chitra from danger. Later Chitra finds out that Raju is not a natural mute. He can actually speak but has chosen not to utter a word due to unknown reasons. After knowing about Raju’s past, Chitra fall in love with him. She decides to marry Raju instead of Mahesh. The reason behind Raju's Mutism and the consequences thereafter form the crux of the movie.

Cast
Sabyasachi as Raju
Archita as Chitralekha
Bijay Mohanty 
Mihir Das as Virendra
Debasis as Mahesh
Prutiviraj Nayak as Pratap
Priyanka
Ushashi Mishra
Satyaki Mishra
Harihara Mohapatra
Mahasweta

Soundtrack

Music has been well composed by Bikash Das

References

External links
 
 Official Website of Mu eka tumara
 Mun eka tumara
 Muhurat of mun eka tumara

2013 films
Odia remakes of Kannada films
Films set in Odisha
2010s Odia-language films
Films directed by Susant Mani